Omobrus is a genus of beetles in the family Carabidae, containing the following species:

 Omobrus pilosus Louwerens, 1952
 Omobrus praetextus Andrewes, 1930
 Omobrus punctulatus Jedlicka, 1935

References

Lebiinae